The 2010 Scotties Tournament of Hearts, the Canadian women's national curling championship, was held from January 30 to February 7 at the Essar Centre in Sault Ste. Marie, Ontario.

The event was described as having a weaker field than normal, as many of the usual provincial champions did not qualify. The event featured only two teams that have won the Scotties before: Jennifer Jones who qualified as last year's champion, and Kelly Scott of British Columbia. Making her first trip to the Scotties as a skip is Saskatchewan's Amber Holland, who won the 2008 Players' Championships. Ontario will be represented by Krista McCarville who won a bronze medal at the 2009 Canadian Olympic Curling Trials. Making their second trips to the Scotties as skips are Quebec's Ève Bélisle, and Nova Scotia's Nancy McConnery. New Brunswick will be represented by former Canadian Junior champion Andrea Kelly who is making her third appearance at the event. Newfoundland and Labrador will be represented former Canadian Mixed Champion Shelley Nichols, while P.E.I. will also be represented by a Canadian Mixed champion in Kathy O'Rourke. Making their debuts as skips are Alberta's Val Sweeting, Manitoba's Jill Thurston and the Territories' Sharon Cormier.

Teams

Round-Robin Standings

British Columbia placed third by virtue of a pre-event draw challenge used to rank teams in case round-robin results failed to provide separation.

Results
All times local (Eastern Time Zone, et)

Draw 1
January 30, 3:00 PM ET

Draw 2
January 30, 7:30 PM et

Draw 3
January 31, 10:30 AM et

Draw 4
January 31, 3:00 PM et

Draw 5
January 31, 7:30 PM et

Draw 6
February 1, 10:30 AM et

Draw 7
February 1, 3:00 PM et

Draw 8
February 1, 7:30 PM et

Draw 9
February 2, 10:30 AM et

Draw 10
February 2, 3:00 PM et

Draw 11
February 2, 7:30 PM et

Draw 12
February 3, 9:30 AM et

Draw 13
February 3, 2:00 PM et

Draw 14
February 3, 6:30 PM et

Draw 15
February 4, 10:30 AM et

Draw 16
February 4, 3:00 PM et

Draw 17
February 4, 7:30 PM et

Tiebreaker 
February 5, 3:00 PM et

Playoffs

1 vs. 2

February 5, 7:30 PM et

3 vs. 4
February 6, 1:00 PM et

Semifinal

February 6, 7:00 PM et

Final

February 7, 2:30 PM et

Top 5 Player percentages

Awards
Sandra Schmirler Most Valuable Player Award
 Erin Carmody, Prince Edward Island
Marj Mitchell Sportsmanship Award
 Kelly Scott, British Columbia

All-Star Teams

First Team
Skip: Kelly Scott, British Columbia
Third: Cathy Overton-Clapham, Team Canada
Second: Jill Officer, Team Canada
Lead: Dawn Askin, Team Canada

Second Team
Skip: Jennifer Jones, Team Canada
Third: Jeanna Schraeder, British Columbia
Second: Sasha Carter, British Columbia
Lead: Jacquie Armstrong, British Columbia

Notes

References

 
Sport in Sault Ste. Marie, Ontario
Scotties Tournament of Hearts
Curling in Northern Ontario
Scotties Tournament Of Hearts
Scotties Tournament Of Hearts
Scotties Tournament Of Hearts
Scotties Tournament Of Hearts